Bojan Savnik (born 24 October 1914; date of death unknown) was a Yugoslav canoeist, born in Laibach, Austria-Hungary, who competed in the late 1930s.

He finished 11th in the folding K-2 10000 m event at the 1936 Summer Olympics in Berlin.

References
Sports-reference.com profile

1914 births
Canoeists at the 1936 Summer Olympics
Olympic canoeists of Yugoslavia
Year of death missing
Yugoslav male canoeists
Slovenian male canoeists
Sportspeople from Ljubljana
Carniolan people